"It's Gonna Be Alright" is a song written and performed by Jamaican contemporary R&B singer Ruby Turner, issued as the lead single from her third studio album Paradise. It contains a sample of "Keep On Movin'" by Soul II Soul. The song reached #1 on the Billboard R&B chart on February 17, 1990.

Charts

Weekly charts

Year-end charts

Cover versions
In 1991, the song was covered by Dutch entertainer Daisy Dee on her eponymous debut album.

See also
List of number-one R&B singles of 1990 (U.S.)

References

External links
 
 

1989 songs
1989 singles
Jive Records singles
Ruby Turner songs
Daisy Dee songs
Song recordings produced by Loris Holland
Songs written by Ruby Turner